Nguyễn Đại Đồng (born 5 September 1986, in Quảng Xương District, Thanh Hóa Province) is a retired Vietnamese footballer who plays as a defender for V.League 1 club Hanoi FC.

Honours

Club
Hà Nội F.C.
V.League 1: 
 Winners : 2010, 2013, 2016, 2018, 2019
 Runners-up : 2011, 2012, 2014, 2015
 Third place:  : 2017
Vietnamese Super Cup: 
 Winners :      2018
 Runners-up : 2013, 2015, 2016
Vietnamese National Cup: 
 Winners : 2019
 Runners-up : 2012, 2015, 2016
AFC Cup
  Quarter-finals 2014 AFC Cup

References 

1986 births
Living people
Vietnamese footballers
Association football defenders
V.League 1 players
Hanoi FC players
People from Thanh Hóa province